Nikolay Yervandi Tsaturyan (born January 8, 1945, in Yerevan) is an Armenian theatre director, actor and playwright, People's Artist of Armenia (2011), Professor. He is the Artistic Director of Vardan Ajemian State Drama Theatre of Gyumri.

Biography
Nikolay Tsaturyan is a son of Ervand Tsatouryan, a movie director. Nikolay studied at the Yerevan Institute of Theater and Fine Arts with Marat Marinosyan, and Vardan Ajemian, whom he considers to be his "maestro". He identifies himself as an atheist. He also studied at Moscow High Courses for Scriptwriters and Film Directors with Georgi Danelia.

He worked at Hayfilm, then assisted to Yuli Raizman at Mosfilm. He was the director of Sundukyan State Academic Theatre of Yerevan, the founder of "Metro" theatre. He is also well known for his leading role at "Comrade Panjouni" film.

Throughout his career Nikolay directed near to 100 plays, shows and events, among them Vahagn Davtyan's "Apricot Tree" (1939), William Saroyan's "The Time of Your Life", Alexander Ostrovsky's "Crazy Money", Alexander Vampilov's "The Elder Son" (Старший сын), Hrant Margarian's & Nikolay Tsaturyan's "And Three Chairs Fell From Heaven" (1991) (Եվ երկինքեն երեք աթոռ ինկան), which won "Audience Award" at Armenian Diaspora Theater Festival in 1991, Anahit Aghasaryan's and Nikolay Tsaturyan's "Save Our Souls" (1990) (Փրկեք մեր հոգիները), which won best direction, best lead actor, best supporting actress, Gabriel Sundukyan's "Power of Money" (Փուղի զորութինը).

References

External links
Nikolay Tsaturyan

1945 births
Living people
Armenian theatre people
Male actors from Yerevan
Armenian atheists